King Zhuang may refer to these monarchs from China's Spring and Autumn period:

King Zhuang of Zhou (died 682 BC)
King Zhuang of Chu (died 591 BC)

See also
Duke Zhuang (disambiguation)